Chala is a Peruvian town located in the Arequipa Region, Caraveli Province, and is the capital of district of Chala. It borders the Pacific Ocean It lies approximately 170 km south of Nazca en route to the Panamerican Highway between Nazca and Camana. It is notable for the nearby Incan ruins of Puerto Inca. According to the 2017 census, it had a population of 9,240 inhabitants.

References

External links 
 Ministerio de Transportes

Populated places in Peru
Arequipa Region